The 2019 All-Ireland Under-20 Football Championship was the second staging of the All-Ireland Under-20 Championship and the 56th staging overall of a Gaelic football championship for players between the minor and senior grades. The championship began on 22 June 2019 and ended on 3 August 2019.

Kildare entered the championship as the defending champions, however, they were beaten by Laois in the Leinster Championship.

The All-Ireland final was played on 3 August 2019 at O'Moore Park in Portlaoise, between Cork and Dublin, in what was their first meeting in a final in 39 years. Cork won the match by 3-16 to 1-14 to claim their 12th championship title overall and a first title since 2009.
 
Dublin's Ciarán Archer was the championship's top scorer with 9-35.

Results

Connacht Under-20 Football Championship

Quarter-final

Semi-finals

Final

Leinster Under-20 Football Championship

First round

Quarter-finals

Semi-finals

Final

Munster Under-20 Football Championship

Quarter-finals

Semi-finals

Final

Ulster Under-20 Football Championship

Preliminary round

Quarter-finals

Semi-finals

Final

All-Ireland Under-20 Football Championship

Semi-finals

Final

Championship statistics

Top scorers

Top scorers overall

Top scorers in a single game

References

All-Ireland Under 20 Football Championship
All-Ireland Under-20 Football Championships